The Mississinewa Valley Conference was an IHSAA-sanctioned conference based in East Central Indiana that lasted between 1952 and 1977. The conference started out as a conference for larger rural schools as a way to provide a higher level of competition than their respective County Conferences typically provided. The conference was stable for its first decade, but consolidation and more regionally based conferences with schools of similar sizes had schools defecting the MVC. The conference ended in 1977, with three schools forming the Classic Athletic Conference, and one team each joining the Mid-Eastern and Mid-Indiana conferences.

Former members

 Eastern played in both the MVC and TCC from 1953 until 1965.
 Played concurrently in MVC and GCC 1952–65.
 Portland played concurrently in the Jay County Conference and MVC 1952–54.
 Known as Driver 1959–66.
 Team name was Yellow Jackets before 1959.
 Wes-Del played concurrently in the MVC and the White River Conference from 1969 to 1977.

Membership Timeline

References

Indiana high school athletic conferences
High school sports conferences and leagues in the United States
Indiana High School Athletic Association disestablished conferences